Đorđe Glišović (born 13 February 1995) is a Serbian football defender, playing for Jedinstvo Putevi.

Club career
Originating from Čajetina, Glišović played with Zlatibor and Jedinstvo Putevi in his youth career. He joined the first team of Jedinstvo Putevi in 2013–14 season, but also stayed with youth team until the end of season. He noted his first senior caps during the 2014–15 season, making 4 Serbian First League appearances. At the beginning of 2015–16 season, Glišović played cup matches against Zemun and Čajetina, and later, during the season, he played mostly matches as a defender. He also played all 15 matches in the Serbian League West, during the first half of 2016–17 season, scoring a goal in the second fixture match against Budućnost Krušik. In the winter break off-season, Glišović was related with returning to Zlatibor, but he continued playing with Jedinstvo Putevi.

Career statistics

Club

Notes & references

1995 births
Living people
People from Čajetina
Association football defenders
Serbian footballers
FK Jedinstvo Užice players
Serbian First League players